Le Pinacle is a protruding pinnacle of rock, at the coastal edge of a Les Landes in the north-west of Jersey, with remains and ruins at its base dating from five periods including the Neolithic and Chalcolithic periods, the Bronze Age, and the Iron Age.  There is also evidence of a rectangular Gallo-Roman temple.

Dolerite
The dolerite stratum has been mined, and used to make axe heads during the Neolithic period and Bronze Age.

Megalith

The megalithic rock is a natural formation, and a prominent landmark which can be seen from St Ouen's bay.

See also
Jersey dolmens

References

External links
 

Saint Ouen, Jersey
Archaeological sites in Jersey
Stone Age Europe